Solomon Chukwuelozona Nwabuokei (born 23 February 1996) is an English professional footballer who plays for Woking, on loan from Barrow, as a midfielder.

Career
After playing non-league football for Enfield Borough, Biggleswade Town, St Albans City and Woking, Nwabuokei signed for Barrow in June 2022. On 23 August 2022, he made his debut for the club during an EFL Cup second round tie against Lincoln City, featuring for just over an hour in the 2–2 draw. In January 2023 he re-joined Woking on loan.

Career statistics

References

1996 births
Living people
English footballers
Enfield Borough F.C. players
Biggleswade Town F.C. players
St Albans City F.C. players
Woking F.C. players
Barrow A.F.C. players
Association football midfielders
Black British sportspeople
Spartan South Midlands Football League players
Southern Football League players
National League (English football) players
English Football League players